Slow jam is an umbrella term for contemporary R&B ballad music with rhythm and blues and soul influences.

Slow Jam, or similar variants, may refer to:

Songs
"Slow Jam", a song by Midnight Star from the 1983 album No Parking on the Dance Floor, covered by Usher and Monica on the 1997 album My Way
"Slow Jam", a song by New Order from the 2001 album Get Ready
"Slow Jam", a song by Four Tet from the 2003 album Rounds
"Slow Jam 1", a song by King Gizzard & the Lizard Wizard from the 2014 album I'm in Your Mind Fuzz
"Slow Jams", a song by Quincy Jones featuring Babyface, Tamia and Barry White, from the 1995 album Q's Jook Joint 
"Slow Jamz", a 2003 song by Twista and Kanye West
"101SlowJam", a 2016 song by Eric Garcetti and the Theodore Roosevelt High School Jazz Band
"Slow Down (Slow Jam)", B-side to the single "Slow Down" by Loose Ends
"Play Another Slow Jam", a 1995 song by Gyrl

Other
Slow Jams (comic), a 1999 graphic novel by David Choe
"Slow Jam the News", a musical segment on Late Night with Jimmy Fallon